Francis Ching-wah Yip (Chinese: 葉菁華; b. 1967) is Director and Associate Professor of Divinity School of Chung Chi College (DSCCC), Chinese University of Hong Kong (CUHK).

Biography
Yip attended in Christian primary schools and was active in student fellowship during high school. He obtained a Bachelor of Social Science, major in Journalism at the CUHK. Between 1992 and 1995, he studied M.Div. at the DSCCC. before receiving a scholarship to do a Th.D. at Harvard Divinity School and graduated in 2004. His Ph.D. thesis was then published as a monograph, named Capitalism as Religion? A Study of Paul Tillich's Interpretation of Modernity.

He joined the DSCCC in 2005 as Assistant Professor. In August 2020, he succeeded Ying Fuk-tsang as the Director of DSCCC. He was nicknamed as "Teacher Frog" by his students at DSCCC.

Works

References

1967 births
Living people
Alumni of the Chinese University of Hong Kong
Academic staff of the Chinese University of Hong Kong
Harvard Divinity School alumni
Hong Kong Protestant theologians
Methodist theologians